The Ultimate Powers Book is a role-playing game supplement published by TSR in 1987 for the Marvel Super Heroes role-playing game.

Contents
The Ultimate Powers Book is a supplement describing almost 300 new powers, with a new character generation system and new range and movement rules.

Publication history
MA3 The Ultimate Powers Book was written by David E. Martin, with a cover by Jeff Butler, and was published by TSR, Inc., in 1987 as a 96-page book.

Reception

Reviews

References

Marvel Comics role-playing game supplements
Role-playing game supplements introduced in 1987